The 2008–09 Israeli Premier League season began on 30 August 2008, and ended on 1 June 2009. Beitar Jerusalem were the defending champions, having won their 6th league title the previous year.

Two teams from Liga Leumit were promoted at the end of the previous season: Hakoah Amidar Ramat Gan and Hapoel Petah Tikva. The two teams relegated were Hapoel Kfar Saba and Maccabi Herzliya.

At a 24 June 2008 IFA administration meeting it was decided that the league would be expanded to 16 clubs for the following season. Due to the expansion, only one team was relegated directly to Liga Leumit, while five clubs were promoted. The eleventh-ranked team played in a play-off match against the sixth-ranked team from Liga Leumit.

Maccabi Haifa clinched their 11th title after a 0–2 win against Maccabi Netanya on 23 May 2009.

Teams

Twelve teams took part in the 2008-09 Israeli Premier League season, including ten teams from the 2007-08 season, as well as two teams which were promoted from the 2007-08 Liga Leumit.

Hakoah Amidar Ramat Gan were promoted as champions of the 2007-08 Liga Leumit. Hapoel Petah Tikva were promoted as runners up. They both returned to the top flight after an absence of one season.

Hapoel Kfar Saba and Maccabi Herzliya were relegated after finishing in the bottom two places in the 2007-08 season.

Stadiums and Locations

Managerial changes

League table

Positions by round

Results
The schedule consisted of three rounds. During first two rounds, each team played each other once home and away for a total of 22 matches. The pairings of the third round were then set according to the standings after first two rounds, giving every team a third game against each opponent for a total of 33 games per team.

First and second round

Third round
Key numbers for pairing determination (number marks position after 22 games):

Relegation playoff
Hakoah Ramat Gan, as the 11th-placed team, faced the 6th-placed Liga Leumit team Maccabi Ahi Nazareth in a two-legged playoff. Hakoah Ramat Gan lost both games and were relegated to Liga Leumit.

Season statistics

Scoring
First goal of the season: Yossi Shivhon for Maccabi Tel Aviv against Bnei Yehuda, 5th minute (30 August 2008)
Last goal of the season: Lior Rafaelov for Maccabi Haifa against Beitar Jerusalem, 58th minute (1 June2009)
First own goal of the season: Nir Davidovich (Maccabi Haifa) for F.C. Ashdod, 57th minute (30 August 2008)
Fastest goal in a match: 39 seconds – Thembinkosi Fanteni for Maccabi Haifa against Maccabi Tel Aviv (27 October 2008)
Goal scored at the latest point in a match: 90+5 minutes – Barak Badash for Hakoah Ramat Gan against Bnei Yehuda (13 September 2008)
Widest winning margin: 4 goals:
Hapoel Tel Aviv 4–0 Beitar Jerusalem (9 February 2009)
Beitar Jerusalem 4–0 Hakoah Ramat Gan (4 April 2009)
Most goals in a match: 6 goals:
Hakoah Ramat Gan 2–4 Beitar Jerusalem (20 September 2008)
F.C. Ashdod 4–2 Bnei Sakhnin (8 November 2008)
F.C. Ashdod 3–3 Maccabi Netanya (20 December 2008)

Discipline
First yellow card of the season: Tamir Kahlon for Bnei Yehuda against Maccabi Tel Aviv, 6th minute (30 August 2008)
First red card of the season: Ronnie Gafney for Maccabi Haifa against F.C. Ashdod, 59th minute (30 August 2008)
Most yellow cards in a match: 12 yellow cards  – Beitar Jerusalem against Maccabi Haifa (28 September 2008)
Most red cards in a match: 4 red cards – F.C. Ashdod against Ironi Kiryat Shmona (13 September 2008)
Most cards in a match: 15 cards (12 yellow and 3 red) – Beitar Jerusalem against Maccabi Haifa (28 September 2008)

Top scorers

See also
 2008–09 Israel State Cup
 2008–09 Toto Cup Al
 List of 2008–09 Israeli football transfers

Notes
A. Biggest away win

References

Israeli Premier League seasons
Israel
1